2012 China Open may refer to:

 2012 China Open (snooker), a snooker tournament
 2012 China Open (tennis), a tennis tournament
 2012 China Open Super Series Premier, an edition of the China Open badminton tournament